St. Theresa's Boys High School is a boys high school (day school) in Bandra, Mumbai, India. It was originally established in 1918 as mixed-education school and was situated in Khar but was taken over and relocated to Bandra in 1952 by current management where it stands today.

History
St. Theresa's Boys High School was called "St. Andrew’s Indian Christian School" from 1918 to 1952. Founded in 1918, the school was then situated in an old building in Khar area of Mumbai and offered mixed-sex education. In 1952, the school was taken over by a Christian religious society called Society of the Divine Word (S.V.D.) and was relocated to its present location in Bandra under the new (existing) name.

Foundation of the school was laid by Valerian Cardinal Gracias on 3 October 1952.

In Oct 1955, the school's name was changed from "St. Andrew’s Indian Christian School" to "St. Theresa's School" and the same year the school enrolled 118 student and started its first academic session. The school was accorded a High School status in 1960. In 1963, all female students (except ninth & Tenth grades) of the school were transferred to another school (Duruelo Convent), thus converting the school to a boys school under the name "St. Theresa’s Boys High School".

Former principals

Alumni
Amjad Khan
Atul Khatri
Jaaved Jaffrey
Terence Lewis
Ashutosh Gowarikar
Ranvir Shorey

See also
 List of educational institutions in Mumbai

References 

1952 establishments in Bombay State
Educational institutions established in 1918
Educational institutions established in 1952
Private schools in Mumbai
High schools and secondary schools in Mumbai
Christian schools in Maharashtra
Schools in Colonial India
Boys' schools in India